Remmina is a remote desktop client for POSIX-based computer operating systems. It supports the Remote Desktop Protocol (RDP), VNC, NX, XDMCP, SPICE, X2Go and SSH protocols and uses FreeRDP as foundation.

Packaging
Remmina is in the package repositories for Debian versions 6 (Squeeze) and later and for Ubuntu versions since 10.04 (Lucid Lynx). As of 11.04 (Natty Narwhal), it replaced tsclient as Ubuntu's default remote desktop client. The FreeBSD ports/package collection also contains it as a separate port and additional protocol-specific plugin ports.

Use
A common use is to connect to Windows machines, to use servers and computers remotely via Remote Desktop Services, by system administrators and novice users.

See also
 Comparison of remote desktop software
 Vinagre

References

External links

 

Remote desktop
Communication software
Free communication software
Free software programmed in C
Remote desktop software that uses GTK
2009 software
Virtual Network Computing
Remote desktop software for Linux